Morey Hole (also known as Morey's Hole), is a  pond in Plymouth, Massachusetts, west of Vallerville and Ship Pond, and southwest of Briggs Reservoir. Camp Child, a former summer camp run by the Old Colony Council of the Boy Scouts of America from 1925 through 1995, surrounds the pond.

External links
South Shore Coastal Watersheds - Lake Assessments 
Environmental Protection Agency

Ponds of Plymouth, Massachusetts
Ponds of Massachusetts